Libera is a genus of air-breathing land snails, terrestrial pulmonate gastropod mollusks in the family Endodontidae.

Originally the genus Libera was placed within the family Charopidae.

Species
Species in the genus Libera include:

 Libera bursatella (Gould, 1876)
 Libera bursatella bursatella (Gould, 1876)
 Libera bursatella orofenensis Solem, 1976
 Libera cookeana Solem, 1976
 Libera dubiosa (Ancey, 1889)
 Libera fratercula (Pease, 1867)
 Libera fratercula fratercula (Pease, 1867)
 Libera fratercula ratotongensis Solem, 1976
 Libera garrettiana Solem, 1976
 Libera gregaria Garret, 1884
 Libera heynemanni (Pfeiffer, 1862)
 Libera incognata Solem, 1976
 Libera jackquinoti (Pfeiffer, 1850)
 Libera micrasoma Solem, 1976
 Libera recedens Garret, 1884
 Libera retunsa (Pease, 1864)
 Libera spuria (Ancey, 1889)
 Libera streptaxon (Reeve, 1852)
 Libera subcavernula (Tryon, 1887) - extinct, the type species
 Libera tumuloides (Garrett, 1872) - extinct
 Libera umbilicata Solem, 1976

Shell description 
The genus Libera was described by Andrew Garrett in 1881. Garrett's type description reads as follows:

Life cycle 
These snails lay their eggs into the umbilicus of their own shells.

References 
This article incorporates public domain text from the reference.

External links 
 Bishop museum info: 

Endodontidae